Stratopedarchēs, sometimes Anglicized as Stratopedarch, was a Greek term used with regard to high-ranking military commanders from the 1st century BC on, becoming a proper office in the 10th-century Byzantine Empire. This title was awarded to senior commanders and officials, while the ordinary stratopedarchai were henceforth low-ranking military officials.

History

Origin and early use
The term first appears in the late 1st century BC in the Hellenistic Near East.

From the 1st century AD, it was used (albeit infrequently) in a broader sense as a literary term to refer to generals, i.e. as a synonym of the older title . Thus in the 4th century, the bishop and historian Eusebius (Church History, IX.5.2) writes of the ", whom the Romans call ".

Middle Byzantine period

In the middle Byzantine period (9th–12th centuries), the term  came to signify more the army on campaign, rather than the camp itself; hence the term  was used more in the sense of 'commander-in-chief'. The title is first attested as a technical term in 967, when Emperor Nikephoros II Phokas named the eunuch Peter as  before sending him with an army to Cilicia. The Escorial Taktikon, written a few years later, shows the existence of two , one of the East (Anatolia) and one of the West (the Balkans). This arrangement parallels that of the two , a fact that led Nicolas Oikonomides to suggest that the post was created as a substitute of the latter office, which was barred to eunuchs until the 11th century. 

The actual nature of the office is difficult to reconstruct, as it is rarely found in technical sources like the Byzantine military and court manuals, and its usage in the historical accounts is simply as another word for a high commander, in place of '' or ''. The precise arrangement suggested by Oikonomides is certainly not in evidence in the 11th and 12th centuries, when the term likely signified a commander-in-chief for a field army composed of professional regiments, rather than an institutionalized position.

Late Byzantine period

The title  ('grand master of the camp') was instituted  by the Emperor Theodore II Laskaris for his chief minister and confidante, George Mouzalon. Theodore II states in a decree that he "established the dignity anew", but no other holder of the office is known before that time. Kodinos reports that he was "supervisor of the provisioning of the army, that is food, drink and all necessities". Like many other titles in the Palaiologan period, the post could be held by two people simultaneously. Only his staff of office differed, with all the knobs except the topmost in silver, and golden engraved knots.

Pseudo-Kodinos further reports the existence of four subordinate , occupying the 65th to 68th rank in the imperial hierarchy respectively. These were:
According to Kodinos these were palace guards armed with the bow. Their name is commonly held to derive from the Arabo-Turkish word murted/murtat ('apostate'), implying they were Christianized Turks, but according to Mark Bartusis may refer more generally to the offspring of mixed Greek–Turkish unions.
According to Kodinos, some served as palace guards, equipped with maces and wearing with a distinctive blue cuirass that bore two white lions facing each other on the chest, but the  supervised those  who were employed as garrison troops in various fortresses.

The dress of these junior members of the court was the same: a white  with embroideries, a long  of "commonly used silk", and a  covered in red velvet and topped by a small red tassel. Their  were of smooth, unadorned wood.

List of known

List of known

Byzantine Empire

Empire of Trebizond

References

Sources

 
 
 
 
 
 
 
 
 
 
 
 

Byzantine army
Byzantine military offices
Greek words and phrases
Lists of office-holders in the Byzantine Empire